Newstalk (formerly NewsTalk 106) is a national independent radio station in Ireland. It is operated by News 106 Limited, a subsidiary of Bauer Media Audio Ireland, and broadcasts under a sound broadcasting contract with the Broadcasting Authority of Ireland.

Newstalk is Ireland's only commercial all-talk station, broadcasting opinion, analysis, entertainment and sport.

Format 
The station is the only commercial radio station in Ireland to take on an exclusively news and current affairs based format. News is broadcast every hour. The station's flagship morning programme is  Newstalk Breakfast, presented by Ciara Kelly and Shane Coleman with Joe Lynham presenting business coverage. Following on from Newstalk Breakfast is The Pat Kenny Show. The show mixes current affairs analysis, human interest interviews with light entertainment stories and live music. From midday, Andrea Gilligan presents Lunchtime Live, where she invites callers to have their  say on the topics of the day. Seán Moncrieff broadcasts from 2pm with The Moncrieff Show, covering politics, history, popular culture and many other topics. Newstalk's drive time show, is The Hard Shoulder with Kieran Cuddihy. It's on every weekday afternoon from 4–7pm and is a round-up of the day's events and interviews with the people at the centre of the stories. Off The Ball is on at 7pm and covers Irish sport and stories to the Newstalk audience with in depth analysis and debate.

Audience share 
On 5 November 2020, Newstalk announced it had recorded an all-time high weekly reach of 804,000 listeners, up 62,000 on the same time the previous year.  The station's listened yesterday figure is an all-time high of 426,000 listeners, up 13,000 on 2019. Newstalk has a prime-time Market Share figure of 6.7%.

History 
In 1999 the Broadcasting Commission of Ireland (BCI) invited applications for a number of new Dublin radio services, expanding on the then duopoly of 98FM and FM104. One was for a speech-based radio service. The Independent Local Radio (ILR) national news provider Independent Network News, was one of two applicants for this licence, and its applicant company, News 106, was awarded the franchise. However, before the station even went on air, several ILR companies decided that they did not want to be part of the venture, and the station's shareholding was restructured, with at launch, 98FM, FM104, Clare FM, Carlow Kildare Radio, LMFM, East Coast Radio, South East Radio and WLR FM, along with Setanta, being the shareholders in the company.

The station first went on air (under its original name NewsTalk 106) on 9 April 2002, with David McWilliams the first presenter. In its original format, it offered Twenty-Twenty News, every twenty minutes. The first 20/20 news bulletins were presented by several newsreaders including Eimear Lowe, James Healy, Dyane Connor, Dimitri O'Donnell, Sean Archibald and Abigail Reilly. In September 2004 the news service was reduced to every thirty minutes ("News 30") along with a revamped news team to replace the original journalists who had left the station by this stage. In Summer 2004, the station signed Eamon Dunphy, dropping David McWilliams, resulting in controversy. In 2004, FM104 was forced to sell its stake as a condition of its takeover by Scottish Radio Holdings. This meant that Communicorp was able to take majority control of the station. Setanta and Hyper Trust remained as minority shareholders.

In 2005, Elaine Geraghty, the original co-presenter of the breakfast time programme on 98FM, was appointed Chief Executive. On 22 May 2006, the BCI announced that its new quasi-national speech-based contract was being awarded to Newstalk, who retained their 106 MHz frequency in Dublin while surrendering its Dublin ILR licence. Newstalk were the sole application for the licence. It began quasi-national broadcasts on 29 September 2006. The media expressed concern at its relative lack of star names and proliferation of unknowns, though noted the presence of George Hook and Seán Moncrieff.

In 2009, Ms Geraghty resigned as CEO and Frank Cronin, Setanta's board representative since 2002, was appointed CEO. Schedule changes included the appointment of former Minister for Agriculture Ivan Yates as breakfast presenter, Damien Kiberd to Lunchtime presenter and the re-engagement of Eamon Dunphy to Sunday Newspaper review programme presenter. This schedule together with the continuity of George Hook, Off the Ball, Sean Moncrieff and Tom Dunne has driven the station to new heights of daily listenership and standing. The station now reaches 305,000 (JNLR February 2012) people daily, the fastest growing adult station in Ireland.

The rugby pundit, George Hook who presented the daily drive time show Right Hook, retired in 2014, he returned to present High Noon. He was suspended in September 2017 following comments he made on rape.

In 2021, Newstalk rebranded its Station Imaging with new Voiceover Mark Cagney

Newstalk News Network 
Newstalk is primarily known as a radio station; however, it is also the provider of the only national radio newswire in Ireland. Newstalk provides 'rip and read' copy and audio 24/7, and also provides a live stream of audio news reading every hour. The latter is used mostly by local radio stations after 7 p.m. across Ireland.

References 

 Dunphy to leave NewsTalk 106

External links 

 

Communicorp
Mass media in Dublin (city)
News and talk radio stations in Ireland
Radio stations in Northern Ireland
Radio stations in the Republic of Ireland
Radio stations established in 2006